Rabbi Maimon ben Joseph (born c.1110) was a Spanish exegete, moralist and dayyan (Hebrew for "judge"). He is best known as the father of Maimonides. His teacher was the respected scholar Joseph ibn Migash. He authored a commentary, in Arabic, on the Pentateuch, and also wrote on Jewish ritual and festival law.

References

12th-century rabbis in al-Andalus
Exponents of Jewish law